This is a summary of 1993 in music in the United Kingdom, including the official charts from that year.

Summary
15 songs reached the number 1 spot this year. Compared to 1992, there was an improvement to singles sales, with sales rising year on year for the first time since 1989. However, none of the singles released this year were million sellers, the first instance of this happening since 1990. The only song to sell over a million in 1993 was one from the previous year, Whitney Houston's cover of "I Will Always Love You". It managed to sell sufficiently well enough to make its way onto the top 10 of both 1992 and 1993.

March saw The Bluebells reach number 1 with "Young at Heart", a song that had previously made number 8 in 1984. It was reissued after appearing in an advert for Volkswagen, and the band reformed to promote the song.

Take That got their first #1 in July, with "Pray". Debuting in 1991 with the #38 hit "Promises", they would go on to score another seven number 1s before splitting in 1996. "Pray" was followed by Freddie Mercury scoring a posthumous number 1 with a remixed version of "Living on My Own", the original version of which made number 50 in 1985, making it the first remix of a previously charted single to reach number 1.

The biggest selling single of the year came from Meat Loaf, who hit #1 for seven weeks from October with "I'd Do Anything for Love (But I Won't Do That)". It came from the album Bat Out of Hell II: Back into Hell, also the biggest selling of the year.

Finally, as usual, December saw the Christmas number one single. Meat Loaf's successor at number 1 was Mr. Blobby, a popular character on the BBC One show Noel's House Party, with "Mr. Blobby" (the first ever eponymously titled number 1 single). In the final week before Christmas, he was knocked off by Take That's "Babe", making Mr. Blobby the first one-week #1 since U2's "The Fly" in November 1991, and making Take That the first act to have three singles in a row all enter at #1. However, the following week (Christmas week) saw Mr. Blobby climb back up to the top, the first time this had happened since January 1969, and officially become this year's Christmas number 1. Take That's "Babe" became the only chart topper of the year to spend only a week at the summit.

In the classical world, the British composer Michael Nyman enjoyed great success with his soundtrack for the film The Piano, which brought him an Ivor Novello Award, Golden Globe, BAFTA and American Film Institute award; the album sold over three million copies. Veteran Welsh composer Daniel Jones died. A less well-known composer, Peter Reynolds, won notoriety when his three-minute work Sands of Time was performed in Cardiff city centre; it is listed by the Guinness Book of Records as the world's shortest opera.

Events
19 February - Elton John is forced to end a concert in Melbourne, Australia a half hour early when a swarm of grasshoppers invades the stage.
16 April – Paul McCartney headlines a concert at the Hollywood Bowl, USA to celebrate "Earth Day". Other performers included Ringo Starr, Steve Miller and Don Henley.
21 April – Former Rolling Stones bassist Bill Wyman marries designer Suzanne Accosta in France.
22 April - The Who's Tommy opens on Broadway.
31 May - Oasis force their way on to the bill at King Tut's Wah Wah Hut, Glasgow.  Alan McGee is in attendance, and then offers the band a recording contract on the spot.
5 June - premiere of Jonathan Harvey's Inquest of Love at the London Coliseum.
28 August - Bruce Dickinson plays his final show with Iron Maiden after announcing his departure from the band earlier in the year. He would rejoin the band in 1999. 
22 October - Oasis sign a recording contract with Creation Records
Rick Astley retires from the music industry at age 27 after selling 40 million records in a five-year period.

Charts

Number-one singles

Number-one albums

Year-end charts

Best-selling singles

Best-selling albums

Best-selling compilation albums

Notes:

Music awards

BRIT Awards
The 1993 BRIT Awards winners were:

Best British producer: Peter Gabriel
Best soundtrack: "Wayne's World"
British album: Annie Lennox: "Diva"
British breakthrough act: Tasmin Archer
British female solo artist – Annie Lennox
British group: Simply Red
British male solo artist: Mick Hucknall
British single: Take That - "Could It Be Magic"
British video: Shakespear's Sister - "Stay"
International breakthrough act: Nirvana
International solo artist: Prince
International group: R.E.M.
Outstanding contribution: Rod Stewart

Mercury Music Prize
The 1993 Mercury Music Prize was awarded to Suede - Suede.

Classical Music
Stephen Caudel - Edel Rhapsody
Nicholas Maw - Violin Concerto

Opera
Michael Nyman – Noises, Sounds & Sweet Airs

Births
12 January – Zayn Malik (One Direction)
17 January – Frankie Cocozza, singer
13 February – Sophie Evans, Welsh singer and actress
19 June – KSI, Youtuber and rapper
5 July – Hollie Cavanagh, English-American singer
29 August – Liam Payne (One Direction)
13 September – Niall Horan (One Direction)

Deaths
23 April - Daniel Jones, composer, 80
22 May - Melville Cook, organist, conductor and composer, 80
19 June - Tony Brent, singer, 65 (heart attack)
7 August – Roy Budd, jazz pianist and film composer, 46 (brain haemorrhage)
11 October - Andy Stewart, singer, 59
9 November - Stanley Myers, film composer, 63 (cancer)
22 November – Anthony Burgess, composer and polymath best known as a novelist, 76
12 December – Joan Cross, operatic soprano, 93

See also
 1993 in British radio
 1993 in British television
 1993 in the United Kingdom
 List of British films of 1993

References

External links
BBC Radio 1's Chart Show
The Official Charts Company

 
British music
Music
British music by year
20th century in music